Inglewood and Thurston Historic District is a national historic district located at Rochester, Monroe County, New York.  The district encompasses 141 contributing buildings (78 primary buildings) in a predominantly residential section of Rochester.  The district developed between about 1920 and 1927, and includes buildings in a variety of architectural styles including Colonial Revival, Arts and Crafts, American Foursquare, and Tudor Revival.  The dwellings reflect designs directed toward a middle-class clientele in a newly developing area of Rochester's Nineteenth Ward. Located in the district is the former Emmanuel Lutheran Church (now the Ebenezer Baptist Church) and the Rochester Presbyterian Home.

It was listed on the National Register of Historic Places in 2015.

See also
 National Register of Historic Places listings in Rochester, New York

References

External links

Historic districts on the National Register of Historic Places in New York (state)
Houses on the National Register of Historic Places in New York (state)
Colonial Revival architecture in New York (state)
Tudor Revival architecture in New York (state)
Historic districts in Rochester, New York
National Register of Historic Places in Rochester, New York